This a list of aircraft of the Swiss Air Force during World War II. During World War II despite Switzerland being neutral throughout Swiss pilots did engage with axis and allied aircraft to defend Swiss airspace.

Fighters 
 EKW D3800 (licensed production of M.S 406)
 Messerschmitt Bf 109

Ground attack 
 EKW C-36

Bombers 
 Dornier Do 217-1 only confiscated

Liaison or army cooperation 
 Messerschmitt Bf 108 Taifun

Trainers 
 Morane-Saulnier MS.230
 Bucker Bu 131

References

Swiss Air Force
List of
Switzerland